Judge William J. Robertson House is a historic home located at Charlottesville, Virginia. It was built in 1859, and is a two-story, roughly rectangular, brick dwelling with elements of the Italianate and Gothic Revival styles.  It has rendered walls scored to simulate ashlar masonry, a hip-and-gable roof with broadly overhanging gable eaves supported by large decoratively carved brackets, and one-story wings and porches.  It was built by Justice William J. Robertson (1817-1898), who was the "acknowledged leader of the Virginia bar" during the second half of the 19th century.

It was listed on the National Register of Historic Places in 1999.

References

Houses on the National Register of Historic Places in Virginia
Gothic Revival architecture in Virginia
Italianate architecture in Virginia
Houses completed in 1859
Houses in Charlottesville, Virginia
National Register of Historic Places in Charlottesville, Virginia